{{DISPLAYTITLE:C6H11NO3S}}
The molecular formula C6H11NO3S (molar mass: 177.22 g/mol, exact mass: 177.0460 u) may refer to:

 Alliin
 N-Formylmethionine (fMet)

Molecular formulas